The Blue Stars Drum and Bugle Corps is a World Class competitive junior drum and bugle corps. Based in La Crosse, Wisconsin, the Blue Stars was one of the thirteen founding member corps of Drum Corps International.

History

The Blue Stars Drum and Bugle Corps was founded in 1964 by Frank Van Voorhis and David Dummer. That first year, there was only a color guard, but soon the color guard merged with the Apple Arrows Drum and Bugle Corps of La Crescent, Minnesota to become the Blue Stars.  The Blue Stars took to the streets in 1965 as a competitive parade corps. They were sponsored by First Federal Savings and Loan and were known as the First Federal Blue Stars. In order to raise funds, First Federal issued stock in the corps and sold it to the citizens of LaCrosse.

In 1966, the corps moved into field competition, and found immediate success, winning several competitions, including the Minnesota State American Legion Championships, before traveling to Washington, DC for the American Legion National Championships, where they finished 20th of 47 junior corps. The following year, the corps finished 10th of the 25 corps competing at the VFW Nationals in New Orleans. This commenced a streak that continued from 1966 through 1979, wherein the corps advanced to the finals of every major competition they entered. During this streak, the Blue Stars won the 1973 Catholic Youth Organization (CYO) Nationals and the 1977 VFW National Championships.

In 1971, at the urging of Cavaliers founder Don Warren and Troopers founder Jim Jones, the Blue Stars, Cavaliers, Madison Scouts, Santa Clara Vanguard, and the Troopers formed the Midwest Combine. This action was taken in reaction to the rigid, inflexible rules of the American Legion and VFW (the primary rule makers and sponsors of both corps and shows) and the low or nonexistent performance fees paid for appearing in the various competitions. The corps felt that not only were they having their creative potential as artistic performing groups stifled, but they were being financially starved. (A similar group of Eastern corps, the United Organization of Junior Corps (also known as the "Alliance"), was formed by the 27th Lancers, Garfield Cadets, Boston Crusaders, Blessed Sacrament Golden Knights, and Blue Rock.) The Combine members felt that the corps should be making their own rules, operating their own competitions and championships, and keeping the bulk of the money those shows earned. For the 1971 season, the corps stuck together, offering show promoters the five corps as a package. Despite pressure on show sponsors, judges, and other drum corps, the Combine corps were not only booked into a number of shows together, but they found a host for a show of their own, which was a spectacular success despite fears of failure that lasted until a standing-room-only crowd arrived literally at the last moment.

In 1972, the Blue Stars, along with the nine other corps from the Midwest Combine and the Alliance, plus the Anaheim Kingsmen, Argonne Rebels, and De La Salle Oaklands were founding members of Drum Corps International, which remains as the sanctioning body for junior corps in North America. At the first DCI World Championships in Whitewater, Wisconsin, the Blue Stars finished in second place in a competition that featured thirty-nine corps from the East, the South, the West Coast, the Midwest and Great Plains, and Canada. For DCI's first eight years, Blue Stars were an annual finalist. In 1980, the corps missed finals, finishing in 13th place and continued to decline for the next two years. The corps, no longer sponsored by First Federal and beset with heavy debt and declining membership, ceased operations after the 1982 season.

Some alumni of the corps refused to see the Blue Stars die. Building a new organization, LBS Cadets, Inc., on the ashes of the old, they returned a corps the field in 1983, competing in the Cadet Corps International circuit under the name, Blue Star Cadets, because the original corps and the Blue Stars name were still encumbered with debt. In 1985, the Blue Star Cadets began competing in Class A60 in Drum Corps Midwest (DCM), which the original corps had helped found in 1978. In 1986, the Blue Star Cadets finished 7th of 20 corps in the DCI Class A60 prelims. Although the corps missed making DCI Finals, the new organization had paid off enough of the old one's debt to regain use of the name, Blue Stars. In the years after regaining its name, the Blue Stars became one of the most consistently competitive corps in Divisions II and III (now Open Class), never placing lower than 5th in its division. The corps won the Class A60 World Championship in 1989 and the renamed Division III World Championship titles in 1993, 2001, and 2003.
 
Disaster loomed in 2003, however, when the corps's fundraising bingo operation suddenly began losing money. A plea to the drum corps public resulted in an influx of funds that saw the corps survive the season that culminated with its fourth DCI title--- earned while going undefeated in competition. The reorganization resulting from the crisis directed more attention across the river from Wisconsin into Minnesota and out into the rest of the Midwest with the result that the corps doubled in size from 53 to over one hundred members and moved into Division II competition for 2004.

With the move to Division II, the Blue Stars began planning for expansion to the then-maximum drum corps size of 135 members and a return to Division I competition. In 2004, the corps placed 5th in Division II, rose to 3rd place in 2005, and returned to Division I competition in 2006 for the first time since 1982. In 2006 and 2007, the corps finished in 14th place at the DCI Division I World Championship Finals. In 2007, the corps introduced a more contemporary uniform design, abandoning the cross-straps and buckle used for the majority of its existence, although their trademark helmet was retained until late in the 2008 season. In 2008, the Blue Stars qualified for World Class Championship Finals for the first time since 1979, and finished in 8th place each season from 2008 to 2010. In 2010, the corps finished with a 91.9, the highest World Class finals score in corps history. The corps missed finals for a single season in 2012 when they placed 13th, before re-entering finals in 2013 placing 12th, and moving up to 9th place in 2014. After placing 11th, 9th, and 10th respectively from 2015 to 2017, the corps again finished 8th in the 2018 and 2019 seasons. In 2020, the corps cancelled its season (along with the rest of DCI) due to the COVID-19 pandemic.

Cadet corps
After the Blue Stars name had been returned to the corps, a cadet corps for younger members was formed. Initially, this was a parade drum and bugle corps. In order to broaden its appeal, the Blue Star Cadets were converted to a youth band with woodwinds as well as brass and percussion instruments. The group has been inactive for several years.

Alumni corps
The Blue Stars Alumni Corps was started in 2005 and marches annually in the La Crosse Oktoberfest parade. In 2014, the alumni corps performed in exhibition at the corps' home show on July 12 to celebrate the corps' 50th anniversary.

Show summary (1972–2022)
Source:

References

External links
Official website

Drum Corps International World Class corps
Musical groups from Wisconsin
La Crosse, Wisconsin
Musical groups established in 1964
1964 establishments in Wisconsin